Various series of rigid inflatable boat (RIB) are operated by naval forces of Iran. Based on a design by Italian Fabio Buzzi, they have been manufactured and modified in Iran.

History 

The cooperation between FB Design and Iranians started in 1998, when frames and blueprints of patrol boat Levriero was purchased by Iran. It is likely that Shahid Joulaee Marine Industries (subordinate to Marine Industries Organization) obtained a license to produce RIB-33SC and FB-55SC models domestically. In 2005, American authorities questioned FB Design about their deals with Iran, effectively putting an end to the cooperation. Iran has reportedly altered some original designs and manufactured similar modifications.

Types 
According to 2015 edition of Jane's Fighting Ships, Iran is known to operate the following models and modifications of rigid inflatable boat:
RIB 42SC ( long, at least one in service)
FB 55 ( long, at least one in service)
FB 38 ( long, at least two in service)
RIB 36 ( long, at least two in service)
RIB 55SC ( long, at least two in service)
In addition to versions mentioned above, RIB 33 is in service in unknown numbers.

According to H.I. Sutton, the Navy of the Islamic Revolutionary Guard Corps commissioned 32 RIBs into service in June 2020, some equipped with rocket launchers and the rest armed with machine guns. The vessels are used by the S.N.S.F., marines of the naval forces, likely for boarding operations.

See also 
 , Iranian speedboat based on designs from FB Design
 , Iranian speedboat based on designs from FB Design
 Iranian high-aspect-ratio twin-hull vessels

References 

Fast patrol boat classes of the Navy of the Islamic Revolutionary Guard Corps
Inflatable boats
Ships built by Marine Industries Organization